And Then I Turned Seven was an American acoustic alternative band from Duluth, Minnesota. The band was formed in 2003 and started booking shows in high school auditoriums, community centers and all-ages clubs across the country and were one of the top unsigned artists on PureVolume and Myspace before changing their name to Jamestown Story on January 1, 2007. And Then I Turned Seven's most well-known songs include "I Miss You", "Goodbye (I'm Sorry)", "Head Spin" and "In Loving Memory".

History

And Then I Turned Seven was formed in 2003 by founding member Dane Schmidt. After releasing his first album, Broken Summer, Schmidt left college to start touring full-time, adding members Pat Tarnowski, Kieren Smith, Trevor McKenzie, and Chris Lee. Soon after, Smith talked his folks into homeschooling to accommodate the band's intense touring schedule. The band released "The Jamestown Story" EP in October 2005 and quickly built an online fan base through social media sites PureVolume and Myspace, earning millions of plays as an unsigned band. After playing over 150 shows in 2005 and 2006, the band changed its name to Jamestown Story.

Members

 Dane Schmidt – lead vocals, acoustic guitar, piano, drums (2003–present)
 Kieren Smith – violin, guitar (2005–2007)
 Pat Tarnowski – guitar (2005–2007)
 Chris Lee – drums (2005–2007)
 Chad Snell – bass (2006–2007)
 Sam Dean – bass (2005–2006)
 Trevor MacKenzie – bass (2005)

Discography

Broken Summer (2003)
The Jamestown Story EP (2005)

References

External links
jamestownstory.com

2003 establishments in Minnesota
Indie rock musical groups from Minnesota
Musical groups established in 2003
Musicians from Duluth, Minnesota
2007 disestablishments in Minnesota
Musical groups disestablished in 2007